Tom Hardy  (born 1946) is an American design strategist and Professor of Design Management at Savannah College of Art and Design (SCAD). As corporate design advisor to Samsung Electronics (1996-2003) Hardy was instrumental in transforming their brand image from follower to innovation leader by creating a new brand-design ethos: "Balance of Reason & Feeling", and building significant global brand equity through judicious use of design strategy and management.  While at IBM (1970-1992), he was an award-winning industrial designer  and later served as corporate head of the IBM Design Program responsible for worldwide identity. His leadership contributed to the revitalization of IBM's brand image via differentiated design such as the iconic ThinkPad.

Early life and education
Hardy's early life was spent in Alabama  where he graduated from Hueytown High School in 1964 and pursued his undergraduate education in industrial design at Auburn University (1964–1970)  under Eva Pfeil (German) and Walter Schaer (Swiss), former students at the famed Ulm School of Design in Germany. During his graduate work in the History and Sociology of Technology and Science at Georgia Institute of Technology (1995-1996), he consulted with Georgia Tech to create CoLab, a unique multi-disciplinary innovation laboratory that integrated engineering, marketing and industrial design for industry-sponsored projects.

Career

IBM 
Early in his career, Hardy was the industrial designer of numerous award-winning IBM products, including the original IBM Personal Computer introduced in 1981. During the 1970s, he also designed advanced industrial design concepts for 'single user computers' during the infancy of personal computing. His work included a human-centered design model in 1973  to complement the IBM engineering prototype of SCAMP  dubbed by PC Magazine as "the world's first personal computer". Examples of Hardy's advanced PC concepts are published in the book: DELETE: A Design History of Computer Vapourware

As corporate head of the IBM Design Program, Hardy directed worldwide identity operations in concert with preeminent designers Paul Rand and Richard Sapper. His design leadership accomplishments have been cited in notable publications, including a London Business School Case Study that documented Hardy's role in development of the first IBM ThinkPad notebook computer (1992)  together with a new differentiated product personality strategy. This work focused on providing more innovative character to help revitalize IBM's brand image in the 1990s.

Design strategist 
Later an independent consultant, Hardy's work with Samsung Electronics (1996-2003)  involved creating a strategic brand-design approach of duality:   "Balance of Reason and Feeling", while integrating a comprehensive design management system and innovation strategy into the corporate culture. His introduction of brand-design infrastructure elements that were definable, repeatable, measurable, scalable and actionable has been cited in business publications as strategic assets that resulted in a unique identity for Samsung and helped elevate the company's global brand image and brand equity value. Another consulting example is Hardy's work with Ford (2005) where he conducted verbal-visual perception research with target customers as a framework for design of their first crossover vehicle, the 2007 Ford Edge.

Hardy's diverse consulting project experience includes: Chick-fil-A, Coca-Cola, Ford, Home Depot, J.P. Morgan, Lenovo, Lowe's, Maytag, Merck, McDonald's, Microsoft, NEA, Polaroid, Porsche, Procter & Gamble, Samsung, Steelcase, Tupperware, Turkcell, Verizon and Xerox PARC.

Educator 

Hardy currently serves as Professor of Design Management and Graduate Coordinator at Savannah College of Art and Design (SCAD)., and has conducted corporate education workshops on innovative  Design thinking and Scenario planning for companies such as Porsche and Steelcase.

Contributions and recognition

Government 

In 1992, Hardy was invited by the U.S. Presidential transition team to participate as a member of President Bill Clinton's Roundtable on Design. The purpose of the event was to create ideas on how innovative design can contribute to America's competitiveness, sustainability and inclusiveness. Following the Roundtable on Design, he was selected to testify before the 103rd Congressional Committee on Science, Space and Technology as to the importance of design innovation in commercialization of technologies and U.S. competitiveness. Hardy also participated in another government design initiative in 1993 as Chair of a National Endowment for the Arts' Design Program working group to propose a White House Council on Design. And in 2000 he was appointed to the Presidential Design Awards Jury for Federal Design Achievement in Graphic Design and Industrial/Product Design

Design management and product design 

The 2007 anniversary issue of PC Magazine highlighted Hardy's innovative management leadership role in the original IBM ThinkPad development process and deemed him 'Innovator of the Year 1992'. Most recently, two products directly influenced by Hardy during his IBM career were selected in 2016 by Time Magazine as being among "The 50 Most Influential Gadgets of All Time". They are: (#5) the first IBM Personal Computer 5150 and (#21) the iconic IBM ThinkPad 700C. The 50 products were cited by Time as "The tech that forever changed the way we live, work and play".

Awards for Hardy's industrial design of IBM products:
 Industrial Designers Society of America Gold IDEA - 1980
 The Premio Smau Award - 1977 (Italy)
 iF Product Design Award - 1983 (Germany)
 I.D. Magazine Annual Design Review Awards - 1977, 1981, 1982, 1983.

See also 
Design Management
Design Strategy
IBM
IBM Personal Computer
IBM 5120
Notable Auburn University Alumnus
Notable Savannah College of Art and Design Faculty
Paul Rand
Richard Sapper
Samsung Electronics
ThinkPad

References

External links
Design 200: Influencers from Alabama website
Samsung Design History
SCAD Design Management Program website
Profile on Verbal-Visual Framework website

1946 births
Living people
American industrial designers
Auburn University alumni
Hueytown High School alumni